Dez Gereh-ye Afshar-e Pain (also Romanized as Dez Gereh-ye Āfshār-e Pā’īn; also known as Dez Gereh) is a village in Chashm Rural District, Shahmirzad District, Mehdishahr County, Semnan Province, Iran. At the 2006 census, its population was 79, in 27 families.

References 

Populated places in Mehdishahr County